Ensar Arslan (born 1 August 2001) is a German professional footballer who plays as a winger for Turkish club Kırklarelispor on loan from Samsunspor.

Career
Arslan made his professional debut for Darmstadt 98 in the 2. Bundesliga on 18 June 2020, coming on as a substitute in the 86th minute for Nicolai Rapp in the 0–1 away loss against Arminia Bielefeld.

On 8 February 2022, Arslan signed a 3.5-year contract with Samsunspor in Turkey.

Personal life
Arslan is of Turkish descent.

References

External links
 
 
 
 

2001 births
Sportspeople from Darmstadt
German people of Turkish descent
Living people
German footballers
Association football wingers
SV Darmstadt 98 players
Samsunspor footballers
Kırklarelispor footballers
2. Bundesliga players
TFF First League players
TFF Second League players
German expatriate footballers
Expatriate footballers in Turkey
German expatriate sportspeople in Turkey